The siege of Fuenterrabía took place in 1523 when the Franco-Navarrese army had taken it in a new incursion after the failure of the third attempt to reconquer the Kingdom of Navarre, which had been occupied since 1512 by troops from the unified Crown of Castile and Crown of Aragon, with Navarrese support. There were Navarrese on both sides.

The Fuenterrabía of the 16th century also included most of the municipal term of the current city of Irun, the municipality of Lezo, and parts of Hendaye, Urruña (Behovia neighborhood) and Pasajes (Pasajes de San Juan). The town and fortress were located on a hill surrounded by thick walls, mountains and the sea at the mouth of the Bidasoa River.

Its border situation and its geographic characteristics made both Charles V, Holy Roman Emperor and Francis I of France covet its possession. For this reason, both nations appointed commissioners to elucidate the problems of water limits in the conflicts of the towns of Fuenterrabía and Hendaye, something that until then had been solved by agreement.

In 1512, the first counteroffensive was carried out to recover the kingdom of Navarre after its invasion by the Crowns of Castile and Aragon, in which Marshal Pedro de Navarre with 2000 men within the contingent of Lautrec and Borbón were stopped by Luis I of the Cave, II Lord of Solera. To prevent another invasion, the fortification was proceeded, ordering in November of that year the construction of a castle in Behovia, which reinforced the effectiveness of the Fuenterrabía fort.

As of 1517, the territorial rights of the area were defined by law by the two kingdoms, that of Spain and that of France, leaving the natives divided.

The Franco-Navarre offensive 
At the beginning of October 1521 the castle of Behovia was taken by the troops commanded by the French Admiral Guillermo Goufier, Lord of Bonnivet, with hardly any casualties, since little resistance was offered. He next surrounded the fortress of Fuenterrabía on October 6, taking it twelve days later, after three assaults by Navarrese and Gascon volunteers, among which nearly a thousand casualties occurred. Diego de Vera, warden of the plaza, surrendered on October 18.

The Lord of Bonnivent established a garrison with 3,000 men, who were 2,000 Gascons and 1,000 Navarrese under the orders of Jacques D'Aillon, Lord of Luda, who remained as mayor of the square "in the name of the King of Navarre". For this reason, the flag of Navarre was waving throughout the siege, despite the intention of the French to raise their flag.

Charles V requested the arbitration of King Henry VIII of England so that he intervened before Francis I and required this position. Knowledge of these conversations by the Navarrese was decisive for the replacement of the garrison months later.

The Siege of the fortress 
Beltrán de la Cueva y Toledo, duke of Alburquerque, was appointed, on May 23, 1522, new captain general of Gipuzkoa, although he had already held the position previously, which with a significant increase in troops from different places, between 3000 and 4,000 German lanskenetes, and soldiers recruited in Castile, Navarre, Aragón, Vizcaya, La Rioja and Álava.

Faced with the difficulties in defending the castle of Behovia, the French army decided to abandon it. The withdrawal was carried out correctly, taking the cannons, weapons and provisions. Later, different explosive charges were arranged to destroy its walls, but its fuses were extinguished by the Castilian troops under the command of Captain Ochoa Sanz de Asua, who took the castle.

Two days later, the Battle of Mount Aldabe or San Marcial took place.

In July 1522, it was decided to surrender the fortress due to starvation. After ten months without being supplied, deaths from starvation began to occur. French troops came who, after crossing the Bidasoa, made the imperial troops flee, being able to supply the square and renew the garrison. For this reason Beltrán de la Cueva was dismissed, who was replaced by Íñigo Fernández de Velasco, Constable of Castile.

The naval control of the fortress allowed the supply to be maintained. Throughout the siege, the red flag of Navarre flew in the fortress, despite the fact that the French tried to impose theirs.

In the winter of 1523-1524 a great offensive was organized by Emperor Charles V against Francis I, with the intention of occupying Toulouse, Lower Navarre, Bayonne and Fuenterrabia. This campaign failed after 24 days with the loss of a quarter of the army due to desertions and disease. These troops regrouped and joined the bulk of the army surrounding Fuenterrabía.

On February 2, the bombardment of the fortress began and negotiations for surrender began. On February 27 the French abandoned the fortress, leaving only Navarrese soldiers, the most notable being Pedro de Navarre, son of Marshal Pedro de Navarra who had been killed in strange circumstances, presumably assassinated, in the Simancas prison in 1522.

On February 29, 1524, pardon was granted to the imprisoned Navarrese, with the condition that within two months they surrendered and gave an oath and loyalty to Charles V. The fortress was surrendered on April 29.

References

External links
http://www.hondarribia.org/

Sieges of the Italian Wars
Battles involving Spain
Conflicts in 1523
Conflicts in 1524
Italian War of 1521–1526